Brave is the sixth studio album by American singer and actress Jennifer Lopez. It was released on October 4, 2007, by Epic Records. Inspired by her marriage with Marc Anthony and taking influences by Jamiroquai and Sade, Brave features prominently samples from 1970s songs, and R&B music. Brave sees Lopez working with new collaborators, such as Ryan Tedder, Midi Mafia, J.R. Rotem, Bloodshy, Lynn & Wade LLP, The Clutch and others, while also working with long-time collaborator Cory Rooney throughout the album.

The album received a mixed reception from critics, with some complimenting its production, calling the album one of her strongest albums to date, while many called it a formulaic and bland album. The album underperformed commercially, becoming her first album to miss the top ten on the Billboard 200 chart, while also missing the top twenty in the UK, Australia, and other markets. It has sold only 650,000 copies worldwide.

The album spawned two worldwide singles: "Do It Well" and "Hold It Don't Drop It". The first received generally favorable reviews, but peaked modesty on the charts, reaching the top-twenty in some countries, but only peaking at number 31 on the Billboard Hot 100 chart, while the latter also received positive reaction, but did not make any significant impact on the charts. Therefore, subsequent singles were cancelled due to the low-impact of previous singles on the charts. Lopez promoted the album with a series of live performances, while also embarking on a co-headling tour with Marc Anthony.

Background and development 
After releasing her fourth studio album, Rebirth (2005), which received mixed reviews from critics, spawned the worldwide hit "Get Right" and became a moderate success on the charts, Jennifer Lopez announced in 2006 that she was going to record her first Spanish album. According to the album's producer Estéfano, the album "will prove critics wrong" from its "big songs that require a voice". Como Ama una Mujer was released in March 2007, opening to a mixed reception, but with high sales and a hit single, "Qué Hiciste".

In a MTV News interview while on the music video set for "Me Haces Falta", the album's second single, Lopez announced she was working on the follow-up to "Como Ama una Mujer" and her first English-language album since Rebirth. According to Jayson Rodriguez of MTV News, the album would see Lopez returning into the pop, R&B, and hip hop world. Lopez stated, "My Spanish album was kind of an opportunity to get away from what I do on my English [albums], to kind of express a different side of myself. This [next] album is more of what people and my fans are used to — you know, just kind of a dance, funk, R&B, hip-hop, all that stuff, all mixed up together to make some great pop music. Basically it's just danceable music," she said.

Production and music 
While on early stages, it was announced that Lopez was working once again with music producer Cory Rooney, who worked on most of her albums, and also Swizz Beatz. "I think I got her at a good time, she’s focused," Swizz said. "She got Marc [Anthony] by her side, he’s serious with the singing as well. And the energy is good, so I’m here to help make history." In July 2007, Yahoo! announced Timbaland, Jermaine Dupri, newcomers Lynn & Wade LLP (Michelle Bell and Peter Wade) and J.R. Rotem as the other producers. A month later, Billboard added Ryan Tedder, Midi Mafia and Bloodshy as further collaborators. She described Brave as "a little Jamiroquai, a little Sade. It's real feel-good music and not what everyone's expecting."

Brave is a pop, dance-pop, and R&B album. The opening track "Stay Together", co-written and produced by J.R. Rotem, is an anthem of monogamy where she declares that heartbreak and dating are so passé, that toughing it out is the new trend. "Heartbreaks are overrated, stay together, that's the new trend," insists Lopez on the dance song filled with breakbeats and synth fills. Second track "Forever" was described as "harem R&B", having a "gut-bucket dirge rhythms", in a song about making sure she is with her significant other for the rest of her life. "Hold It Don't Drop It" references the chugging bass line from "It Only Takes a Minute", the 1975 disco-funk song by Tavares. Fourth track and lead-single "Do It Well" was considered a "classic dance floor J-Lo with its hip-hop beat and disco sirens at the bridge." It samples the breakdown from Eddie Kendricks' 1973 smash "Keep on Truckin'." Ryan Tedder co-wrote and produced the song, stating: "I love that song. It's a lot of fun. I'd never done a song like it at that point. I took it as a challenge. I just looked at some of the top pop female artists at the time: JLo, Beyoncé, Rihanna, Britney before she went off the reservation. I thought, `I know I can write just as well as (their songwriters).' She heard it, flipped out, and it became the first single."

"Gotta Be There" samples the intro of Michael Jackson's 1971 Motown hit "I Wanna Be Where You Are" and references hip-hop dancefloor burner "Puerto Rico", while "Never Gonna Give Up" begins with almost two minutes of her voice weaving in and out of a string orchestra, with lyrics discussing about finding closure after a difficult breakup, which was alleged to be about her ex-fiancée Ben Affleck, especially the lyrics, "Forgiving him was the first thing I had to do in order to move on/Forgetting him was not as easy to do." The rock-etched "Mile in These Shoes" features spare verses, which seem to emerge from a "dank, empty warehouse", according to Slant Magazine's Eric Henderson, before the chorus opens up with a hip-hop/rock barrage of drums. Lyrically, the song thrusts a middle finger at the haters, with J.LO singing about they can't truly understand what it's like to be her until they walk a mile in her shoes. The midtempo synth-overloaded "The Way It Is" follows, with lively drums and string flourishes building toward a wall of synths, while midtempo "Be Mine" has "make-it-up-as-you-go-along" lyrics, including "Looking through a coffee table book at a small café on Broadway." In "I Need Love," Lopez convinces herself it's time to quit partying and settle down over zippy strings and percussion lifted from Bill Withers' "Use Me." The piano-spiked ballad "Wrong When You’re Gone" has softly clapping production, while the title track "Brave" finds Lopez singing about a newfound fearlessness, set to a steady beat and triumphant strings. The album closes with a remix of "Do It Well" featuring Ludacris.

Promotion
The album's cover art was unveiled on September 5, 2007, along with its track list. The art taken by Alexei Hay sports two 'Jennifers' facing each other in front of purple futuristic background. Spence D. of IGN picked the song as the "Album Cover of the Week", due to the "wonderful" disco allusions contained in the cover art. Weeks later, promotional photos from "Brave" were released. The album's marketing campaign started with a 9-day trip to London. The singer who visited the British capital with husband Marc Anthony performed "Do It Well" in U.K. TV show called 'Parkinson'. Lopez also performed on "Good Morning America" (singing "Do It Well", "Hold It Don't Drop It" and "Let's Get Loud"), "Dancing With the Stars", "Fashion Rocks" (performing "Do It Well" and "Waiting for Tonight") and others. Lopez also embarked on a tour with Marc, the "Jennifer Lopez and Marc Anthony en Concierto", on September 29 in New Jersey and concluded it on November 3 in Miami.

Singles
"Do It Well" was released as the lead single of Brave. The song was sent to radio stations on August 21, 2007, and digitally on September 17, 2007. It was a minor hit in the U.S., charting at number 31 on the Billboard Hot 100, but topped the US Hot Dance Club Songs chart. Elsewhere, the song fared better, reaching number two in Italy, while peaking inside the top-twenty in six countries. The accompanying music video "has her delivering J-Lo blows to S&M kidnappers in a sleazy basement club." "Hold It, Don't Drop It" was released as the second and final single from the album on January 21, 2008. It only charted on the UK Singles Chart for three weeks, reaching a peak of 72. The video directed by Melina Matsoukas, which featured a pregnant Lopez, premiered December 4, 2007.

Other charted songs
Due to digital sales, "Mile in These Shoes" charted in Finland at number sixteen on the singles chart and number fourteen on the download chart. The album's title track "Brave" charted for nine weeks on the Bulgaria Singles Top 40, reaching number 19.

Critical reception

Brave received mixed reviews from most music critics, according to Metacritic, which assigns a normalized rating out of 100 to reviews from mainstream critics, receiving an average score of 52, based on twelve reviews. Kerri Mason of Billboard was positive with the album, calling it "another market-smart collection of radio fodder, rather than Lopez's artistic breakout," remarking that "no one does classy pop quite like she does." Dan Gennoe of Yahoo! Music complimented the album, calling it "actually one of her strongest albums to date - tied with 2005's uncharacteristically complete and substantial Rebirth." While considering an "excellent record", Dan Aquilante of New York Post opined that it was "Lopez's best effort since her 2002 groundbreaking remix disc J to tha L-O!." Alex Macpherson of The Guardian praised the album for its "chunky bass lines, disco strings and purring beats", noting that "while marriage may have made Lopez happier than ever-the production bounces with positivity-it has not diminished her capacity for being a diva in the slightest."

Stephen Thomas Erlewine of AllMusic called it "comfortable", writing that "it doesn't try too hard, it doesn't have many surprises, but it's cheerful and not without its charms [...] It's nothing more than modest music for mellow good times, but it's lively enough to be fleeting fun, with enough good tunes for a mild party, preferably one that's held at home." Jason Richards of NOW agreed, writing that the songs are "formulaic but catchy, and the production is meticulous." Eric Henderson of Slant Magazine praised the song "The Way It Is", calling it "a nice head of steam all the way up to its double-time wall of sound", but criticized the fact that the album "aims to uphold the standards of individuality we have, for whatever reason, come to expect from our dance floor divas." Daniel Wolfe of About.com commented that "the beats are so light and the lyrics so bland that only a few tracks give us a glimpse of what once was an exciting dance floor diva." In a more negative tone, Mike Joseph of PopMatters wrote that the album "has neither a strong artistic personality nor boffo production, and as a result, ends up being just another disposable pop record with no redeeming value." Jonathan Bernstein of Entertainment Weekly commented that "even expensive beats and uplifting material are offset by listless vocals." Eventually, Entertainment Weekly placed the album at number 5 on their list of worst albums of 2007.

Commercial performance
Brave was generally viewed as a sales disaster and a commercial disappointment. It debuted at number twelve on the US Billboard 200 with 52,600 copies sold in its first week, making it her first studio effort to miss the chart's top ten. In its second week, the album suffered a big fall to number 38 (dropping 65%). It has sold 173,000 copies in the United States to date, making it Lopez's lowest-selling and lowest-charting album of her career.  The album also performed poorly internationally; only reaching as high as six on the Japanese Albums Chart and Swiss Albums Chart. In Italy, "Brave" charted within the top-ten, while in the UK, it missed the top-twenty, debuting at number 24, remaining on the charts for only two weeks. In Australia, "Brave" only spent one week on the charts, debuting and peaking at number 46. Brave has sold 650,000 copies worldwide as of 2013. Critic Anna Barbarella suggested that the album "performed catastrophically on the charts because [Lopez] embraces a hardness which alienated the public."

Track listing

Notes
  signifies a vocal producer
  signifies a co-producer
  signifies an additional producer
 "Hold It Don't Drop It" – Contains a sample of Tavares' "It Only Takes a Minute" (Dennis Lambert, Brian Potter)
 "Do It Well" – Contains a sample of Eddie Kendricks' "Keep on Truckin'" (Leonard Caston, Jr., Anita Poree, Frank Wilson)
 "Gotta Be There" – Contains a sample of Michael Jackson's "I Wanna Be Where You Are" (Leon Ware, Arthur Ross)
 "The Way It Is" – Contains a sample of Great Pride's "She's a Lady" (Gennaro Leone, Bruce Rudd)
 "Be Mine" – Contains a sample of Paul Mauriat's "Sunny" (Bobby Hebb)
 "I Need Love" – Contains a sample of Bill Withers' "Use Me" (Bill Withers)

Personnel

 Pedro Alfonso – violin, viola
 Jim Annunziato – engineer
 Scott Barns – make-up
 Michelle Lynn Bell – producer, vocal arrangement, vocals (background)
 Big D – producer
 Chuck Brody – producer
 CFOS – mixing assistant
 Travis Cherry – producer
 Clutch – producer
 Alec Deruggiero – engineer
 Oak Felder – producer
 William Garrett – keyboards, engineer
 Larry Gold – conductor, string arrangements
 Alexei Hay – photography
 John Hill – producer, mixing
 Keri Hilson – vocals (background)
 Hit Boy – programming, producer, instrumentation
 Peter Wade Keusch – synthesizer, programming, producer, engineer, vocal arrangement, writing
 Gelly Kusuma – assistant engineer, mixing assistant
 Jennifer Lopez – executive producer
 Manny Marroquin – mixing
 Josh McDonnell – guitar, engineer
 Candice Nelson – vocals (background)
 Chasity Nwagbara – vocals (background)
 Ken Paves – hair stylist
 Philosophy – producer
 Herb Powers – mastering
 Julio C. Reyes – engineer, string arrangements, vocal producer
 Jared Robbins – mixing assistant
 Corey Rooney – executive producer, brass arrangement, vocal producer
 José Juan Sánchez – engineer
 Sizzler Ponderosa – vocals (background)
 Chris Soper – mixing assistant
 Corey Stocker – engineer
 Bruce Swedien – mixing
 Ryan Tedder – programming, producer, instrumentation
 Mike Tschupp – assistant engineer, mixing assistant
 Peter Wade – synthesizer, guitar, programming, mixing, writing
 Chasity Wagbara – vocals (background)
 Bruce Waynne – producer, engineer
 Monique Williams – vocals (background)

Charts

Certifications

References

2007 albums
Albums produced by Bloodshy & Avant
Albums produced by Hit-Boy
Albums produced by J. R. Rotem
Albums produced by Ryan Tedder
Epic Records albums
Jennifer Lopez albums
Albums produced by Cory Rooney
Albums produced by Oak Felder
Pop albums by American artists